The electoral division of Derwent is one of the 15 electoral divisions in the Tasmanian Legislative Council. It is situated in the central south of the state.

The last boundary redistribution occurred in 2017.

As of 31 January 2019, there were 25,637 enrolled voters in the division. The next election in the division is due in May 2021.

The division is named after the Derwent River and includes the Central Highlands and Derwent Valley local government areas, as well as some outer Hobart suburbs such as Bridgewater, Chigwell, Claremont, and towns such as Bothwell, Hamilton, Maydena, New Norfolk, and Westerway.

Members

See also

 Tasmanian House of Assembly

References

External links
Parliament of Tasmania
Tasmanian Electoral Commission - Legislative Council

Derwent